Klyuchevsky (masculine), Klyuchevskaya (feminine), or Klyuchevskoye (neuter) may refer to:
Vasily Klyuchevsky (1841–1911), Russian historian
Klyuchevsky District, a district of Altai Krai, Russia
Klyuchevsky (inhabited locality) (Klyuchevskaya, Klyuchevskoye), name of several inhabited localities in Russia
Klyuchevskaya Sopka, a stratovolcano on the Kamchatka Peninsula, Russia